CEMS - The Global Alliance in Management Education or CEMS (formerly the Community of European Management Schools and International Companies) is a cooperation of leading business schools and universities with multinational companies and NGOs. The CEMS Global Alliance includes 34 academic institutions on every continent, nearly 70 corporate partners and eight social partners (NGOs) from around the globe. CEMS administers the delivery of the CEMS MIM degree in its member schools, supports the CEMS Alumni Association (CAA) and facilitates general cooperation among its members.

CEMS MIM
CEMS Master in International Management (CEMS MIM) is a one-year degree program for a select group of students at the member institutions,  taught jointly by CEMS business schools and universities. Created in 1988 by founding members from the University of Cologne, HEC Paris, ESADE and the Bocconi University, it was the first supra-national MSc. The aim of CEMS is to develop knowledge and provide education that is essential in the multilingual, multicultural and interconnected business world.

The MIM Programme consists of three terms: two academic terms and one internship term. The two academic terms must be consecutive, while the internship term can take place at any time during the graduate period of studies. Students must spend at least two out of the three terms abroad. In addition to completing one's home degree, graduation from CEMS also requires completion of a business project, skill seminars, an international internship, and two foreign language exams.

Each CEMS academic member has a limited number of places available. In many cases, schools have prerequisites to be admitted into the selection process, including a high-grade average and proof of language skills. The selection process typically requires the student to already be enrolled or selected for a Master of Business degree with a member university before applying for the CEMS MIM. CEMS graduates receive a degree from their home institution as well as from CEMS.

Global ranking
The CEMS MIM has consistently ranked among the top 10 in the Masters in Management Ranking since 2005 by the Financial Times.

Academic members
Schools offering the CEMS Master's in International Management (CEMS MIM):

Corporate partners

Nearly 70 corporate partners contribute financially on an annual basis and provide the programme with human resources and input into the curriculum itself in each country they are based. They chart skills courses, give lectures or invite CEMS students to company activities where students learn about corporate practices or solve cases. These connections are very useful to promote the company to the students, while the students gain insight into real-world problems and solution approaches.

Students are advised to be responsible and arrange by themselves an internship partner which will accept the student intern for at least ten consecutive weeks. There are student visa requirements that each student takes responsibility to abide by, and the regulation varies by each local government.

Social partners

The first CEMS social partners joined the organisation in December 2010. These are the first in a series of non-profits and NGOs that contribute to the alliance in a way identical to corporate partners (selection and admission of students, governance, curriculum delivery, proposal of internships and employment opportunities). This new initiative is part of a major sustainability drive from within CEMS. In the same vein, CEMS has also signed the PRME (Principles for Responsible Management Education) declaration.

Alumni association 
The CEMS Alumni Association (CAA), founded in 1993 by CEMS graduates, is an international network of CEMS graduates throughout the world. To date, there are nearly 16,000 CEMS alumni. The Graduation Ceremony takes place each year during the CEMS Annual Events (usually at the end of November) which is hosted by one of the CEMS member schools.

The CAA is led by an alumni board and is present in many countries through local committees of CEMS alumni. The local committees are responsible for keeping in contact with CEMS alumni and organizing professional and social activities. They meet regularly to discuss the activities and development of the association. The alumni board comprises the CAA President, the CEMS Executive Director, a representative of the CEMS Student Board, a representative of CEMS member schools, three local committee representatives, two senior alumni and two junior alumni. It proposes and develops initiatives to foster career and personal development opportunities for its alumni members and represents alumni interests on the CEMS Executive Board.

While students stay at partner universities, there are support groups called CEMS clubs through which CEMS students share their identities. The extended network of CEMS students spans schools across the world.

Footnotes

Notes

References

External links 
Official CEMS website

Business schools
College and university associations and consortia in Europe
College and university associations and consortia in the United Kingdom